Nairobi Western Bypass Highway, is a planned road in Kenya, the largest economy in the East African Community. When completed, it will connect the town of Kikuyu to the town of Ruaka, both in Kiambu County.

Location
At Ruaka, it will connect to the Nairobi Northern Bypass Highway.

Overview
This road is one of the four bypass highways built to direct motorized traffic away from the central business district of the city of Nairobi, to alleviate the perennial traffic jams on the city streets. The bypass highways include (a) Nairobi Northern Bypass Highway (b) Nairobi Eastern Bypass Highway (c) Nairobi Southern Bypass Highway and (d) Nairobi Western Bypass Highway. It is one of these four bypass roads that form a  ring-road around the city.

A total of six interchanges and overpasses will be built, one each in the six townships where the four-lane dual carriageway is planned to pass. This way, the traffic on the highway will not interfere or be impeded by the surface traffic in the urban centers.

Construction
The Nairobi Western Bypass Highway will cost an estimated KSh17.3 billion (US$173 million). In February 2019, China Road and Bridge Corporation, the selected contractor, began construction of this highway. Funding for this project was provided by the Exim Bank of China. Construction is expected to last 39 months.

See also
 List of roads in Kenya
 List of bypass highways in Nairobi

References

External links
 Why you will soon be paying on the spot to use major roads As of 16 June 2018.

Roads in Kenya
Transport in Kenya
Kiambu County
Transport infrastructure in Africa